The Fort Wayne Kekiongas played their first and only season in 1871 as a charter member of the National Association of Professional Base Ball Players.

First game
The honor of playing the first game of the newly organized National Association of Professional Baseball Players was decided by coin flip.

Bobby Mathews, 140 lbs, and 20 years old, hurled a 2−0 shutout for the Kekiongas.  Deacon White, catcher for the Cleveland Forest Citys got 3 hits in 4 at-bats; the other Cleveland players only shared 2 hits among them. Deacon White scored the first hit, the first extra-base hit (a double) and was the first to hit into a double-play.

The game was rained out in the top of the 9th inning. Attendance was 200.

Bobby Mathews, who went on to play five seasons each in the National Association, National League, and American Association, is the only player ever to pitch 100 games or to win at least 50 in three different major leagues. He is credited with inventing the spitball and the out-curve. Deacon White was another historic player, ending his 22-year career as playing owner of Buffalo's Brotherhood team.

Regular season

Season standings

Record vs. opponents

Roster

Player stats

Batting

Starters by position
Note: Pos = Position; G = Games played; AB = At bats; H = Hits; Avg. = Batting average; HR = Home runs; RBI = Runs batted in

Other batters
Note: G = Games played; AB = At bats; H = Hits; Avg. = Batting average; HR = Home runs; RBI = Runs batted in

Pitching

Starting pitchers
Note: G = Games pitched; IP = Innings pitched; W = Wins; L = Losses; ERA = Earned run average; SO = Strikeouts

References
1871 Fort Wayne Kekiongas season at Baseball Reference

Fort Wayne Kekiongas
1871 in Indiana